Albert Bers (11 December 1931 – 25 February 2021) was a Belgian football player and coach. He became the first coach of the Belgium women’s national football team in 1976 and was the coach until 1990. He became also coach of several Belgian clubs, including K.R.C. Mechelen. He was footballer for among others Sint-Truidense V.V.
 
Bers died in Genk on 25 February 2021, aged 89.

References

External links

 

1931 births
2021 deaths
People from Sint-Truiden
Belgian footballers
Footballers from Limburg (Belgium)
Association football defenders
Belgian sports coaches
Belgium women's national football team managers
Place of death missing
20th-century Belgian people